Azamabad Industrial Estate is an Industrial estate located in Hyderabad, India. It is located in Azamabad.

Many historic companies are located which include cigarette manufacturer VST Industries.

A power plant, Azamabad Thermal Power Estate was operationalized in 1956.

History
Azamabad Industrial Estate was built during the time of the Nizam. 

Hyderabad State
Economy of Hyderabad, India
Industrial parks in India